The 1991 IFMAR 1:10 Electric Off-Road World Championships was the fourth edition of the IFMAR 1:10 Electric Off-Road World Championship was held in United States in the city of Detroit from 4–11 August. The host club was SEMROCC Racing with the tracks location in Freedom Hill Park in the Sterling Heights area of the city. A large entry of over 120 drivers attended the event., October 1991

2WD Top 10

4WD Top 10 Results

Reference

Works cited

IFMAR 1:10 Electric Off-Road World Championship